The history of Jews in Bosnia and Herzegovina spans from the arrival of the first Bosnian Jews as a result of the Spanish Inquisition to the survival of the Bosnian Jews through the Holocaust and the Yugoslav Wars. Judaism and the Jewish community in Bosnia and Herzegovina has one of the oldest and most diverse histories in the former Yugoslav states, and is more than 500 years old, in terms of permanent settlement. Then a self-governing province of the Ottoman Empire, Bosnia was one of the few territories in Europe that welcomed Jews after their expulsion from Spain.

At its peak, the Jewish community of Bosnia and Herzegovina numbered between 14,000 and 22,000 members in 1941. Of those, 12,000 to 14,000 lived in Sarajevo, comprising 20% of the city's population.

Today, there are 281 Jews living in Bosnia and Herzegovina, recognised as a national minority. They mostly have good relations with their non-Jewish neighbors.

History

Ottoman rule

The first Jews arrived to Bosnia and Herzegovina in period from 1492 to 1497 from Spain and Portugal.
As tens of thousands of Jews fled the Spanish and Portuguese Inquisitions, Sultan Bayezid II of the Ottoman Empire welcomed Jews who were able to reach his territories. Sephardi Jews fleeing Spain and Portugal were welcomed inand found their way toBosnia and Herzegovina, Macedonia, Thrace and other areas of Europe under Ottoman control. Jews from the Ottoman Empire began arriving in numbers in the 16th century, settling mainly in Sarajevo. The first Ashkenazi Jews arrived from Hungary in 1686, when the Ottoman Turks were expelled from Hungary Among them was Tzvi Ashkenazi, who remained in Sarajevo for three years as rabbi. 
The Jewish community prospered in Bosnia, living side by side with their Bosnian Muslim neighbors, as one of the largest European centres for Sephardi Jewry outside of Spain.

Jews in the Ottoman Empire were generally well-treated and were recognized under the law as non-Muslims. Despite some restrictions, the Jewish communities of the Empire prospered. They were granted significant autonomy, with various rights including the right to buy real estate, to build synagogues and to conduct trade throughout the Ottoman Empire. Jews, along with the other non-Muslim subjects of the Empire, were granted full equality under Ottoman law by 1856.

In the late Ottoman time, the Sarajevo-based Sephardi rabbi Judah Alkalai played a prominent role as a precursor of modern Zionism by advocating in favor of the restoration of the Jews to the Land of Israel.

Habsburg rule

The Austro-Hungarian Empire occupied Bosnia and Herzegovina in 1878, and brought with them an injection of European capital, companies and methods. Many professional, educated Ashkenazi Jews arrived with the Austro-Hungarians. The Sephardi Jews continued to engage in their traditional areas, mainly foreign trade and crafts.

Sephardic Jews have certainly had a stronger role in BiH, given that only in Sarajevo, Banja Luka and Tuzla separate Ashkenazi communities were active, whereas Tuzla was the only city in which the Ashkenazi were numerous (there Hilde Zaloscer was born).
In this period Moshe ben Rafael Attias achieved prominence as scholar of the Islamic faith and of medieval Persian literature.

Kingdom of Yugoslavia

World War I saw the collapse of the Austro-Hungarian Empire, and after the war Bosnia and Herzegovina was incorporated into the Kingdom of Yugoslavia.
In the census of 1921, Ladino was the mother language of 10,000 out of 70,000 inhabitants of Sarajevo.
By 1926, there were 13,000 Jews in Bosnia and Herzegovina.

The Bosnian Jewish community remained prominent after the unification of Yugoslavia. In the 1920s and 1930s Kalmi Baruh was a pioneer of Sephardic studies and Hispanic studies and an eminent leftist intellectual. Daniel Ozmo was active in Belgrade as a progressive painter and printmaker. Isak Samokovlija also started his literary career in the 1930s, which he continued after the war. Laura Papo Bohoreta was an active feminist and writer.

World War II

In 1940, there were approximately 14,000 Jews in Bosnia and Herzegovina, with 10,000 in Sarajevo.

With the invasion of Yugoslavia in April 1941 by the Nazis and their Allies, Bosnia and Herzegovina came under the control of the Independent State of Croatia, a Nazi puppet-state. The Independent State of Croatia was headed by the notoriously anti-Semitic Ustaše, and they wasted little time in persecuting non-Croats such as Serbs, Jews and Romani people.

On 22 July 1941, Mile Budaka senior Minister in the Croatian government and one of the chief ideologists of the Ustaše movementdeclared that the goal of the Ustaše was the extermination of "foreign elements" from the Independent State of Croatia. His message was simple: "The basis for the Ustasha movement is religion. For minorities such as Serbs, Jews, and Gypsies, we have three million bullets." In 1941, Ante Pavelićleader of the Ustaše movementdeclared that "the Jews will be liquidated in a very short time".

In September 1941 deportations of Jews began, with most Bosnian Jews being deported to Auschwitz (many first to Kruščica concentration camp) or to concentration camps in Croatia. The Ustaše set up concentration camps at Kerestinac, Jadovna, Metajna and Slana. The most notorious, where cruelty of unimaginable proportions was perpetrated against Jewish and Serbian prisoners were at Pag and Jasenovac. At Jasenovac alone, hundreds of thousands of people were murdered (mostly Serbs), including 20,000 Jews.

By War's end, 10,000 of the pre-War Bosnian Jewish population of 14,000 had been murdered. Most of the 4,000 who had survived did so by fighting with the Yugoslav, Jewish or Soviet Partisans or by escaping to the Italian controlled zone (approximately 1,600 had escaped to the Italian controlled zone on the Dalmatian coast - among them Flory Jagoda, née Papo). 
Jewish members of the Yugoslav Army became German prisoners of war and survived the war. They returned to Sarajevo after the war.
Avraham Levi-Lazzaris, who emigrated to Brasil, became explorer of the first mines of diamonds in Rondônia, while Moses Levi-Lazzaris (1944–1990), mechanical engineer, became a Trotskyist militant.

Righteous among the Nations from Bosnia and Herzegovina
The people of Sarajevo helped many Jews to abscond and exfiltrate - among many, the story of the Hardaga and Kabilio families as well as of the Sober-Dragoje and Besrević families became particularly noteworthy after the war.
The Righteous among the Nations from Bosnia and Herzegovina are those Bosnians who were honored by the Yad Vashem Memorial as Righteous Among the Nations, i.e. non-Jews who used their lives to save Jews from murder. Forty-two Bosnians have been awarded the title of Righteous Among the Nations.

Socialist Yugoslavia

The Jewish Community of Bosnia and Herzegovina was reconstituted after the Holocaust, but most survivors chose to emigrate to Israel. The community came under the auspices of the Federation of Jewish Communities in Yugoslavia, based in the capital, Belgrade.

Jewish personalities remained prominent in Socialist Bosnia and Herzegovina. Cvjetko Rihtman was the first director of the Sarajevo Opera in 1946–1947; his son Ranko will later be part of the Sarajevo rock band Indexi. Oskar Danon also achieved fame as composer and conductor during Yugoslav times.
Ernest Grin was one of the leading Yugoslav medical doctors and member of Bosnia and Herzegovina Academy of Sciences and Arts.
Emerik Blum, founder of Energoinvest, was Sarajevo's mayor from 1981 to 1983 and member of the Organizational Committee of the 1984 Winter Olympics.
Ivan Ceresnjes was active as an architect, supervising the restoration of Jewish buildings and sites, including the Ashkenazi Synagogue, the Kal Nuevo temple and the 16th-century Old Jewish Cemetery, Sarajevo, whose project he was slated to present 24h before the war broke out in March 1992.

In the early 1990s, before the Yugoslav Wars, the Jewish population of Bosnia and Herzegovina was over 2,000, and relations between Jews and their Catholic, Orthodox and Muslim neighbors were very good.

War in Bosnia and Herzegovina
The Jewish community of Bosnia and Herzegovina was headed by Ivan Ceresnjes from 1992 until his emigration to Israel in 1996. His tenure coincided with the Bosnian War of 1992–1995. 
When the besieging Serb army occupied the Jewish cemetery in Sarajevo, from where they sniped on the city, Ceresnjes gave permission to the Army of the Republic of Bosnia and Herzegovina to target the cemetery.

The Sarajevo Jewish humanitarian society, La Benevolencija, also provided aid to thousands of besieged Sarajevo residents, supplying food, medicine, and postal and radio communications. 
Ceresnjes told a local paper that the nonsectarian relief effort was partly a gesture of gratitude to local Muslims who had hidden Jews during the Nazi occupation of Yugoslavia.
After the war started, La Benevolencija assisted the American Jewish Joint Distribution Committee in the evacuation of 2,500 Sarajevo residents, only one-third of whom were Jewish. There were 11 evacuations in all, three by air early on in the war, and eight by bus convoy after the airport had been closed to civilian traffic. While other convoys were stopped, the Ceresnjes convoys all got through, as field staff from the Joint negotiated cease fires to ensure safe transfer.

In 1997, the Jewish population of Bosnia and Herzegovina was 600, about half of whom were living in Sarajevo. Most Jews who had fled Sarajevo and Bosnia chose to remain in Israel after the wars had ended, though some returned and others moved elsewhere, such as Robert Rothbart (born Boris Kajmaković).

Independent Bosnia and Herzegovina

The Jewish Community in Bosnia and Herzegovina has been led by Jakob Finci since 1995.
The Constitution of Bosnia and Herzegovina reserves certain top political positions, including membership of the Presidency and of the House of Peoples to members of the three constitutive peoples (Bosniaks, Croats and Serbs). In 2009 the European Court of Human Rights established in the Sejdić and Finci v. Bosnia and Herzegovina ruling that the country's Constitution violates the European Convention on Human Rights. An agreement between political parties to amend the Constitution accordingly is still pending, notwithstanding international pressure.
This has not prevented Bosnian Jews from achieving prominent positions: among them, Sven Alkalaj was Minister of Foreign Affairs from 2007 to 2012.

Culture

Sarajevo Haggadah

The Sarajevo Haggadah is a 14th-century illuminated manuscript which has survived many close calls with destruction. Historians believe that it was taken out of Spain by Spanish Jews who were expelled by the Inquisition in 1492. Notes in the margins of the Haggadah indicate that it surfaced in Italy in the 16th century. It was sold to the national museum in Sarajevo in 1894 by a man named Joseph Kohen.

During World War II, the manuscript was hidden from the Nazis by Dr. Jozo Petrovic, the director of the city museum and by Derviš Korkut, the chief librarian, who smuggled the Haggadah out to a Muslim cleric in a mountain village near Treskavica, where it was hidden in the mosque among Korans and other Islamic texts. During the Bosnian War of 1992–1995, when Sarajevo was under constant siege by Bosnian Serb forces, the manuscript survived in an underground bank vault.

Afterwards, the manuscript was restored through a special campaign financed by the United Nations and the Bosnian Jewish community in 2001, and went on permanent display at the museum in December 2002.

Synagogues

The oldest synagogues in Bosnia and Herzegovina were built by the Sephardi community in the 16th century.
During the Austro-Hungarian period, the new Ashkenazi community also built their own temples, often adopting the Moorish Revival architectural style, as in the case of Sarajevo's Ashkenazi Synagogue. Most of them were destroyed during World War Two, including Sarajevo's Il Kal Grande.
Four synagogues remain in Sarajevo:
 The Old Temple (Stari Hram/Kal Vježu, also known as Sijavuš-pašina daira or Velika Avlija): A Sephardi synagogue together with a large inn named the Great Courtyard is known to have been built in 1581 with the donation of Turkish Beylerbey Sijamush Pasha to help the poor members of the Jewish community in Sarajevo. It endured two fires in 1697 and 1768. The temple's current looks stems from restoration/renovations in 1821. It now serves as a Jewish museum.
 The New Temple (Novi Hram/Kal Nuevo): Built alongside the Old Temple, today it serves as an art gallery owned by the Jewish community of Sarajevo.
 The Bjelave Synagogue (Kal Di La Bilava): During WW2 the building was confiscated by the Ustaše and was used as a detention facility.
 The Ashkenazi Synagogue: Designed by Karel Pařík and built in 1902 for the growing Ashkenazi community in the Moorish Revival architectural style.
In the rest of the country some synagogue buildings have been preserved and renovated (such as in Doboj) but they do not host services.
The Jewish cultural center Arie Livne was opened in Banja Luka in 2015.

Cemeteries

Old Jewish Cemetery, Sarajevo
Rogatica Jewish Cemetery: established in 1900, it hosts 16 tombstones plus 10 others probably older, stones sunk in the ground. Tumbs hold inscriptions in Hebrew, Ladino and Serbo-Croatian. There is also a memorial to the victims in the Second World War.
Burial site of Rabbi Moshe Danon in Stolac (1832, The Sarajevo Megilla), restored by Ivan Ceresnjes in 1990-1991

Prominent Bosnian Jews
Judah Alkalai, Rabbi, early member of the Zionist movement
Sven Alkalaj, Minister of Foreign Affairs of Bosnia and Herzegovina from 2007 until 2012
Moshe ben Rafael Attias (1845–1916), scholar of Islamic Law and medieval Persian literature
Kalmi Baruh, writer and philosopher
Emerik Blum, businessman, founder of Energoinvest, former Mayor of Sarajevo
Laura Papo Bohoreta, feminist writer (1891–1942)
Ivan Ceresnjes, architect-researcher, former president of the Jewish community of Bosnia and Herzegovina and vice-chairman of the Yugoslav Federation of Jewish Communities from 1992 to 1996
Oskar Danon, composer and conductor
Rav Moshe Danon, known as the Rabbi of Stolac
David Elazar, Israeli general and Chief of Staff of Israel Defense Forces
Jakob Finci, current spiritual leader of the Bosnian Jewish community.
Moshe David Gaon (1889-1958), historian, scholar of the Sephardic world, bibliographer, educator, journalist, poet, pioneer of Ladino research.
Ernest Grin (1899–1976), Academician, professor, medical doctor, member of Bosnia and Herzegovina Academy of Sciences and Arts, laureate of AVNOJ award, WHO expert, founder of several medical establishments in the aftermath of WW2 
Flory Jagoda, American guitarist, composer and singer, known for her interpretations of Ladino songs, including her composition for Hanukkah, Ocho Kandelikas.
Avraham Levi-Lazzaris (1905–2008), businessman, explorer of the first mines of diamonds in Rondônia, Brazil, Holocaust survivor.
Moses Levi-Lazzaris (1944–1990), mechanical engineer, Trotskyist militant in Brazil, Holocaust survivor.
Zoran Mandlbaum (1946–2015), Leader of the Jewish Community in Mostar during the War
Daniel Ozmo (1912–1942), painter and printmaker
Roza Papo, military physician and general
Ranko Rihtman, musician, member of the Sarajevo rock band Indexi
Cvjetko Rihtman, musicologist, folklorist, composer and first director of the Sarajevo Opera in 1946–1947
Robert Rothbart, basketball player
Isak Samokovlija, writer
Sanda Smital, painter
Marina Toschich, world-renowned musician and master oud player.
Hilde Zaloscer (1903–1999) World-renowned art historian, Egyptologist and Coptologist.
Marina Finci painter

See also

Sarajevo Synagogue
Sarajevo Haggadah
La Benevolencija
Jewish cultural center Arie Livne, opened in Banja Luka in 2015.

Further reading
The Righteous Among the Nations – Bosnian Muslim Rescuers in Sarajevo: Mustafa and Zejneba Hardaga, Izet and Bachrija Hardaga, Ahmed Sadik
The Righteous Among the Nations – Bosnian Rescuers: Roza Sober-Dragoje and Zekira Besrević

References

External links
Excerpts from Jews in Yugoslavia – Part I 
Jewish Virtual Library – Bosnia-Herzegovina, Stephanie Persin
American Jewish Joint Distribution Committee – Bosnia-Herzegovina
Bosnian Jewry: A Small Community Meets a Unique Challenge During the 1990s War  – Interview with Ivica Ceresnjes (Interviewed by Manfred Gerstenfeld)
Interesting Story about Jews living in BiH, from 1930s until Today

 
Bosnia and Herzegovina Jews